The Journal of the History of Biology is a quarterly peer-reviewed academic journal covering the history of biology as well as philosophical and social issues confronting biology. It is published by Springer Science+Business Media and the editors-in-chief are Karen A. Rader (Virginia Commonwealth University) and Marsha L. Richmond (Wayne State University). According to the Journal Citation Reports, the journal has a 2015 impact factor of 0.897.

References

External links 
 

Publications established in 1968
History of science journals
English-language journals
Quarterly journals
Springer Science+Business Media academic journals